Ludovic Ambruş (born 17 September 1946) is a Romanian former wrestler who competed in the 1972 Summer Olympics.

References

External links
 

1946 births
Living people
Olympic wrestlers of Romania
Wrestlers at the 1972 Summer Olympics
Romanian male sport wrestlers
World Wrestling Championships medalists